During the 2019–20 season, Ajax participated in the Eredivisie, the KNVB Cup, the UEFA Champions League, the UEFA Europa League and the Johan Cruyff Shield.

Due to the COVID-19 pandemic, on 21 April, Dutch Prime Minister Mark Rutte announced that events that require a permit are forbidden until 1 September. This meant that football matches were also not allowed, resulting in the end of the 2019–20 Eredivisie season. As a result, the KNVB decided on 24 April to maintain the current league positions but not to appoint a champion. Since Ajax was in first place on 8 March (after the last completed round), it was awarded the highest 2020–21 UEFA Champions League spot without being crowned as national champion.

Squad

Squad information

Transfers
For a list of all Dutch football transfers in the summer window (1 July 2019 to 31 August 2019) please see List of Dutch football transfers summer 2019. For a list of all Dutch football transfers in the winter window (1 January 2020 to 1 February 2020) please see List of Dutch football transfers winter 2019–20.

In

Out

On loan

Transfer summary
Undisclosed fees are not included in the transfer totals.

Expenditure

Summer:  €55,200,000

Winter:  €0,000,000

Total:  €55,200,000

Income

Summer:  €195,400,000

Winter:  €5,350,000

Total:  €200,750,000

Net totals

Summer:  €140,200,000

Winter:  €5,350,000

Total:  €145,550,000

Pre-season and friendlies

Competitions

Overview

Eredivisie

League table

Results summary

Results by round

Matches

KNVB Cup

Johan Cruyff Shield

UEFA Champions League

Third qualifying round

The third qualifying round draw was held on 22 July 2019.

Play-off round

The play-off round draw was held on 5 August 2019.

Group stage

UEFA Europa League

Round of 32

Statistics

Appearances and goals

|-
|colspan="14"|Players sold or loaned out after the start of the season:

|-

Goalscorers

Last updated: 7 March 2020

Clean sheets

Last updated: 7 March 2020

Disciplinary record

Last updated: 7 March 2020

References

Ajax
AFC Ajax seasons
Ajax